The 2018 FC Irtysh Pavlodar season is the 27th successive season that the club will play in the Kazakhstan Premier League, the highest tier of association football in Kazakhstan. Irtysh will also participate in the Kazakhstan Cup and the Europa League.

Season events
On 21 December 2017, Gerard Nus was appointed as the new manager of Irtysh Pavlodar on a two-year contract.
On 28 April 2018 Nus was sacked as the club's manager, with Dmitry Kuznetsov being appointed as caretaker manager. On 13 June, Oirat Saduov was announced as Irtysh Pavlodar's new manager.
On 10 July, Irtysh Pavlodar announced the return of Dimitar Dimitrov on a -year contract.

Squad
.

Transfers

In

Released

Trial

Friendlies

Competitions

Premier League

Results summary

Results by round

Results

League table

Relegation play-off

Kazakhstan Cup

UEFA Europa League

Qualifying rounds

Squad statistics

Appearances and goals

|-
|colspan="14"|Players away from Irtysh Pavlodar on loan:
|-
|colspan="14"|Players who left Irtysh Pavlodar during the season:

|}

Goal scorers

Disciplinary record

References

External links
Official Website

FC Irtysh Pavlodar seasons
Irtysh Pavlodar